Azzo VII d'Este, Marquis of Ferrara (also known as Novello; 1205 – 16 February 1264) was marquis of Ferrara from 1215 to 1222, and again from 1240 until his death.

The son of Azzo VI d'Este and a noblewoman from the Aldobrandeschi family, he married in 1225. He became the leader of the Guelph forces in the March of Ancona and had to face the invasion of Duke Rainald of Spoleto during the War of the Keys in 1228–1230. In 1242 Azzo took the chance to capture Ferrara in 1242, after defeating Ezzelino III da Romano, and established his family's lordship in the city, which lasted until late Renaissance times.

In 1259, he again defeated Ezzelino and his Ghibellines troops in the  Battle of Cassano. He married two times, and had one son, Rinaldo (born after 1221), who was captured by Frederick II and died as prisoner in Apulia (1251). He had three daughters: Cubitosa (died in 1275), Constanza (died in 1315), and Beatrice (died in 1262). He was succeeded by his grandson Obizzo.

1205 births
1264 deaths
Azzo 07
13th-century Italian nobility